Morrisroe is a surname.

List of people with the surname 

 Brian Morrisroe (born 1972), Irish footballer
 James Morrisroe (1875–1937), Irish politician
 Mark Morrisroe (1959–1989), American performance artist and photographer
 Patrick Morrisroe (1869–1946), Irish priest 
 Patricia Morrisroe, American journalist

Surnames
Surnames of British Isles origin
Surnames of Irish origin